Heitor Canalli (3 March 1910 – 21 July 1990) was a Brazilian football player who played for five clubs between 1927 and 1941. He also played for the Brazil national team.

References

Brazilian footballers
Brazilian expatriate footballers
Brazil international footballers
1934 FIFA World Cup players
Botafogo de Futebol e Regatas players
CR Flamengo footballers
Torino F.C. players
Expatriate footballers in Italy
Serie A players
People from Juiz de Fora
1910 births
1990 deaths
Association football midfielders
Sportspeople from Minas Gerais